Popova is a crater on Mercury. Its name was adopted by the International Astronomical Union in 2012, after the Russian painter and designer Lyubov Popova.

The crater has a bright ray system that overlies surrounding features and is thus young.

The peak-ring basin Chekhov is to the southeast of Popova, and the flat-floored Unkei is to the northeast.

References

Impact craters on Mercury